The Motorola Razr2 (often stylized as RAZR2) is a series of clamshell/flip mobile phones from Motorola, and is one of the series in the 4LTR line. It is the successor to the popular Razr series. The Razr2 is 2 mm thinner than its predecessor but slightly wider. Some versions feature Motorola's MotoMagx operational platform, based on the MontaVista Linux OS. The Razr2 was made available on every US carrier, and EVDO, GSM and HSDPA versions of it were released by late 2007.

The phone improved picture quality, speed and multimedia capabilities over the original Razr. It also featured an external screen with touch sensitive buttons which allowed users to use some of the phone features without opening the flip, and Motorola's CrystalTalk technology to improve call quality and help reduce background noise. Different color variants were released, including a Luxury Edition Razr2. It features a Micro-B USB socket for charging, data transfer or the stereo headset (S280 / syn1458B).

V8

The GSM version of the Razr2, the Razr2 V8 was released in July 2007 around the World. As of October 15, 2007, T-Mobile had offered the V8 model. It has 420 MB on board memory, but a 2 GB on board memory version was also released. It also features EDGE, a 500 MHz processor and a 2.0" QVGA external display with touch sensitive buttons which allowed users to play music through this screen without opening the phone.

The Razr2 V8 runs the MotoMagx operational platform, based on the MontaVista Linux OS rather than the previous Motorola phone OS called P2K (based on Versatile Real-Time Executive). MotoMagx's user interface was more customizable and user-friendly than Motorola's past offers.

A Luxury Edition version of this device was released in time for the 2007 holiday season featuring 18k gold-plated accents and a soft snake-skin-like back.

V9m

The Razr2 V9m was the EV-DO version of the Razr2 series. It was released through SK Telecom on June 29, 2007. Verizon Wireless released the V9m in the US on August 29, 2007 in the US, followed by Sprint, Alltel and other CDMA carriers.

Razr2 V9m features 2 Mbit/s EV-DO browsing speeds, two 65k color displays, 45 MB onboard memory with up to 2 GB microSD support. This version of the series featured Motorola's P2K operating system instead of the newer MotoMagx.

V9

The 3G version, Razr2 V9, was released on September 1, 2007 and was exclusively made available through AT&T in the US. The V9 was also released in Europe, Asia, and Latin America. It features 3.6 Mbit/s HSDPA speeds, two 262k color displays with touch sensistive buttons for media playing, 3G, a powerful 512 MHz CPU, ~50 MB on board memory, and supports up to 2 GB microSD. The processor speed was doubled (compared to the V9m), and featured Motorola's Crystaltalk. The V9 was 13.7mm thin instead of the 11.9mm the V8 and V9m featured. This was due to its more advanced capabilities and larger battery capacity.

AT&T's version of the device did not have the same external screen capabilities the International version had. By late 2008, AT&T released the improved V9x with the same external screen features the International version of the V9 came with.

A Ferrari Edition of the Razr2 V9 was released in June 2008 in Asia, Europe, and Latin America. It featured a Ferrari logo on the back of the phone, a Ferrari-branded leather case and pre-loaded Ferrari wallpapers and ringtones.

V9x

The Razr2 V9x was released in December 2008. Replacing the V9 on AT&T, the V9x adds support for AT&T's "AT&T Navigator" GPS software as well as Video Share and new external screen features. The V9x also came with an improved user interface compared to the previous V9. It has 3.6 Mbit/s HSDPA speeds, two 262k color displays, a 512 MHz CPU, ~50 MB on board memory with support of up to 8 GB microSD, video telephony and GPS technology.

The V9x was also released in Canada through Rogers Communications and Australia through Telstra.

TV commercial 
The television commercial features the song "Le Disko" from the electronica band Shiny Toy Guns. Also featured are models Nikolett Barabas and Matt Mullins in a fight scene involving using the phones to slash each other's clothes (like a namesake razor).

A Razr2 commercial by Sprint for North America features several RAZR2's impaled into various objects. It then shows Eric Mangini, then head coach of the NFL's New York Jets, watching on his Razr2 highlights of a Jets game that were critical of the team's performance; he flings the phone in disgust, with the phone impaling a car.

See also 

 Motorola Razr
 Motorola Razr3
Sony Ericsson W980
Nokia 6650 fold
 Motorola v950

References

Razr2
Mobile phones introduced in 2007